James Harvey Tuthill (February 19, 1826 – January 18, 1894) was an American lawyer, politician, and judge from New York.

Life 
Tuthill was born on February 19, 1826, in Wading River, New York, the son of seafarer and merchant Captain Nathaniel Tuthill and Clarissa Miller. The family moved to Greenport when he was eleven. His brother was Franklin Tuthill, an assemblyman and editor of The New York Times.

Tuthill studied in the Miller Place Academy for three years, winning distinction at the school. When he was seventeen, he entered the Sophomore class in Williams College. He graduated from there three years later with honors. He then began studying law, first with his mother's relative Judge George Miller of Riverhead then with Judge Joseph S. Bosworth of New York City. He was then admitted to the bar and in 1849 he began practicing law in Riverhead with Judge Miller. The firm was known as Miller & Tuthill. He was originally a Whig.

In 1860, Tuthill was elected to the New York State Assembly as a Republican, representing the Suffolk County 1st District. He served in the Assembly in 1861 and 1866. He then served as district attorney of Suffolk County from 1867 to 1875, followed by Surrogate of the county from 1880 to 1892.

Tuthill was a director of the Suffolk County National Bank and attorney, legal advisor, and trustee of the Riverhead Savings Bank. He joined the Long Island Historical Society when it was founded in 1863, and was one of its councilors from 1864 until his death. He helped organize the Suffolk County Historical Society in 1886 and served as its first president until his death. He helped organize the Riverhead Village Library Association, donating a number of valuable books from his own library to the association. He was a leading member of the local Congregational Church, serving as superintendent of its Sunday school for forty-four years and president of the Suffolk County Sunday-school Association for more than twenty years. In 1850, he married Maria Frances Foster. Their only child was Ruth Halsey.

Tuthill died from a brain hemorrhage while at the Surrogate's office in a trial of a will case on January 18, 1894. He was buried in Riverhead Cemetery.

References

External links 

 The Political Graveyard

1826 births
1894 deaths
Politicians from Suffolk County, New York
Suffolk County district attorneys
People from Wading River, New York
People from Greenport, Suffolk County, New York
Williams College alumni
19th-century American lawyers
New York (state) state court judges
19th-century American politicians
Republican Party members of the New York State Assembly
19th-century American judges
American Congregationalists
Burials in New York (state)